Calca may refer to:
Calca Peninsula, a peninsula in South Australia
 Calca Province, one of thirteen provinces in the Cusco Region of Peru
 Calca District, one of the eight districts in the Calca Province
 Calca, Peru, capital of the Calca District and Province
 Calca, South Australia, a settlement on the west coast of Eyre Peninsula
 CALCA, the abbreviation for calcitonin-related polypeptide alpha